WEKX (102.7 FM, "We Rock 102.7") is a radio station broadcasting a classic rock music format. Licensed to Jellico, Tennessee, United States, the station is currently owned by Whitley Broadcasting Co., Inc. and features programming from Westwood One.

References

External links

EKX
Classic rock radio stations in the United States
Campbell County, Tennessee